TestDox is a documentation generator for Java to create an overview of test case methods written for the JUnit unit testing framework presented as full sentences.
Created by Chris Stevenson in 2003, to date versions exist for .net, PHP and Ruby.
The term testdox format refers to the naming convention used for the test methods.

See also

Behavior driven development (or BDD)
JUnit
PHPUnit
rSpec

External links
Introducing BDD blog post by Dan North
Agiledox blog post by Joe Walnes
TestDox release 0.1 blog post by Chris Stevenson
AgileDox project (Java), by Chris Stevenson
AgileDox project source code for Java testdox and C# nAgileDox in CVS repository
TestDox for IntelliJ IDEA, Codehaus
TestDox for .NET
TestDox (PHPUnit), by Sebastian Bergmann
TestDoxon Tool, open-source project by Delicate Sound Of Software AB
TestDox for Go

Documentation generators
Software documentation
Extreme programming